The 125th Street station is an express station with four tracks and two island platforms. It is the northernmost Manhattan station on the IRT Lexington Avenue Line of the New York City Subway. Located at Lexington Avenue and East 125th Street (also known as Dr. Martin Luther King, Jr. Boulevard) in East Harlem, it is served by the 4 and 6 trains at all times, the 5 train at all times except late nights, and the <6> train during weekdays in peak direction. This station was constructed as part of the Dual Contracts by the Interborough Rapid Transit Company and opened in 1918.

A planned northern extension of the Second Avenue Subway would connect with this station and with the Metro-North Railroad's Harlem–125th Street station, located one block west.

History

Construction and opening
Following the completion of the original subway, there were plans to construct a line along Manhattan's east side north of 42nd Street. The original plan for what became the extension north of 42nd Street was to continue it south through Irving Place and into what is now the BMT Broadway Line at Ninth Street and Broadway. In July 1911, the IRT had withdrawn from the talks, and the Brooklyn Rapid Transit Company (BRT) was to operate on Lexington Avenue. The IRT submitted an offer for what became its portion of the Dual Contracts on February 27, 1912.

In May 1912, it was decided to modify the planned layout of the station from three tracks and two island platforms on each level, to two tracks and one island platform per level, saving $1.25 million.

In 1913, as part of the Dual Contracts, which were signed on March 19, 1913, the Public Service Commission planned to split the original Interborough Rapid Transit Company (IRT) system from looking like a "Z" system (as seen on a map) to an "H"-shaped system. The original system would be split into three segments: two north–south lines, carrying through trains over the Lexington Avenue and Broadway–Seventh Avenue Lines, and a west–east shuttle under 42nd Street. This would form a roughly "H"-shaped system. It was predicted that the subway extension would lead to the growth of the Upper East Side and the Bronx.

125th Street station opened on July 17, 1918 as part of the extension of the original subway up Lexington Avenue to 125th Street and into the Bronx. Initially, service was provided only as a shuttle on the local tracks of the Lexington Avenue Line starting at Grand Central, continuing past this station and under the Harlem River to 167th Street on the IRT Jerome Avenue Line. On August 1, the "H system" was put into place, with through service beginning on the new east and west side trunk lines, and the institution of the 42nd Street Shuttle along the old connection between the sides. Express service began on this date. The cost of the extension from Grand Central was $58 million.

The opening of this station resulted in development of the surrounding neighborhood of East Harlem.

Later years
The city government took over the IRT's operations on June 12, 1940. In 1952 or 1953, a public address system was installed at this station, providing information to passengers and train crews.

In 1981, the Metropolitan Transportation Authority listed the station among the 69 most deteriorated stations in the subway system.

The station's elevators were installed in November 1989, making the station one of the earliest to comply with the Americans with Disabilities Act of 1990. This station was renovated in 2005.

Station layout 

The station is unusual in design, as a bi-level station with island platforms but not configured in the standard express-local lower-upper configuration. Instead, the upper platform serves northbound (uptown) trains and the lower level serves southbound (downtown) trains. Adding to the unusual design is the local track on each level having train doors open to the right; the express tracks likewise have doors opening to the left. North of the station, just after crossing the Harlem River, the line splits into the IRT Jerome Avenue Line (heading north) and the IRT Pelham Line (heading east). On the lower platform, each track comes from one line, and a flying junction south of the station allows trains to be diverted to the local or express track. Throughout the station's history, this station has been one of the more important on the line as it is the northernmost transfer point between express trains to the IRT Jerome Avenue and White Plains Road Lines, and local trains to the IRT Pelham Line. The 4 and 6 stop here at all times, and the 5 stops here at all times except late nights.

There is an active tower at the north end of the upper platform; it is a satellite to the tower at Grand Central–42nd Street, which controls the entire length of the Lexington Avenue Line.

Exits
This station has a mezzanine with two separate turnstile banks. The northern turnstile bank leads to two staircases going to both northern corners of Lexington Avenue and 125th Street, and an elevator going to the northeastern corner of Lexington Avenue and 125th Street. The southern turnstile bank has two exits leading to both southern corners of Lexington Avenue and 125th Street.

A fifth entrance will be built as part of the proposed Second Avenue Subway station here. It would be located on the southern side of 125th Street in the median of Park Avenue, and an ancillary facility would be located one block south. The proposed fifth exit is right underneath Metro-North Railroad's Harlem–125th Street station on Park Avenue, which is one block west of the Lexington Avenue exits. An ancillary facility would also be built at the southeast corner of 125th Street and Third Avenue.

Planned Second Avenue Subway station 

Harlem–125th Street is the planned northern terminal for Phase 2 of the Second Avenue Subway. It would be built underneath 125th Street, below and perpendicular to the existing Lexington Avenue Line station. Phase 2 would stretch from 96th Street to 125th Street, with the next stations south being 116th Street and 106th Street. When opened, it will initially be served by the Q train, with the T providing service when phase 3 of the line is built.

Introduction of the station to plans 
A station at Lexington Avenue and 125th Street was not on the original Second Avenue Subway proposed as part of the New York City Transit Authority's 1968 Program for Action; instead, a Second Avenue Subway station would be built at 126th Street and Second Avenue. The line was to be built in two phases—the first phase from 126th to 34th Streets, the second phase from 34th to Whitehall Streets. 

In March 2007, the Second Avenue Subway was revived. The line's first phase, the "first major expansion" to the New York City Subway in more than a half-century, included three stations in total and cost $4.45 to $4.5 billion, spanning from 105th Street and Second Avenue to 63rd Street and Third Avenue. Phase 1 opened on January 1, 2017, with the line's northern terminal at 96th Street.

The second phase, between 125th and 96th Streets, was allocated $525 million in the MTA's 2015–2019 Capital Plan for planning, design, environmental studies, and utility relocation. This phase will complete the project's East Harlem section. The alignment will run under Second Avenue to 124th Street, before turning west on 125th Street. On October 18, 2016, the de Blasio administration announced a rezoning plan for East Harlem. One of the three Special Transit Land Use (TA) districts is for the area of the 125th Street station.

On November 21, 2016, the MTA requested that the Phase 2 project be entered into the Project Development phase under the Federal Transit Administration's New Starts program. On December 15, several elected officials for the area announced that they were seeking $6 billion of funding for Phase 2 of the line, including $2 billion from the federal government. These officials wished to secure funding from the presidential administration of Barack Obama before Obama's term ended on January 20, 2017. In their request for funding, they cited that they wanted to avoid an uncertain response from the administration of Donald Trump and start construction on Phase 2 as soon as possible. The FTA granted this request in late December 2016. Under the approved plan, the MTA would complete an environmental reevaluation by 2018, receive funding by 2020, and open Phase 2 between 2027 and 2029. In January 2017, it was announced that Phases 2 and 3, which are expected to cost up to a combined $14.2 billion, were on the Trump administration's priority list of 50 most important transportation projects nationwide.

Current plans
In July 2018, the MTA released a supplemental environmental assessment for Phase 2 of the Second Avenue Subway. The proposed three-track station was reduced to two tracks. The modification would reduce flexibility, but would allow the section under 125th Street to be mined, rather than being constructed as cut-and-cover, thereby reducing impacts on nearby buildings. Simulations showed that a two-track layout could support the same level of service that the three-track layout could have provided: 28 trains per hour. To make up for the loss of the track, the tail tracks west of the station would be lengthened.

When built, this platform will be the northern terminal of the Second Avenue Subway. It will be five levels below street level, or two levels below the lower-level IRT Lexington Avenue Line platform. The station was originally proposed to have a three-track, two-island platform layout with a mezzanine above it and switches to the east of the platforms. The July 2018 plans call for two tracks and one island platform, with switches both to the west and the east. The tail tracks would extend to Lenox Avenue to allow for six trains to be stored, three per track. This would also provide a provision for a future expansion of the line along 125th Street.

Extra transfer capacity to the existing Lexington Avenue Line station would be provided as part of the construction of the Harlem–125th Street terminal. In its July 2018 supplemental report, the MTA indicated that it wanted to build new escalator entrances to the subway station complex on two of the corners at Lexington Avenue and 125th Street, replacing the existing entrances there. Entrance 1 would be located on the southeast corner, while entrance 2 would tentatively be located on the northwest corner, although this has yet to be confirmed. The original 2004 plans had called for entrance 2 to be located on the southwest corner, but the MTA stated that the location was comparatively small. The Second Avenue Subway station will include a new exit leading directly from the Second Avenue Line platform to the median of Park Avenue at the south side of 125th Street, allowing for a quick connection to the Metro-North station. In the 2018 report, the MTA stated that it also wanted to include a property on the intersection's southeast corner within the construction site. The ancillaries were also shifted from the locations proposed in the 2004 FEIS. Ancillary 1 and Ancillary 2, which were respectively supposed to be located at Third and Park Avenues on 125th Street, were both moved south to 124th Street. The ancillary buildings were also shifted west because the station cavern had been relocated west.

Second Avenue Subway Community Information Center
A Second Avenue Subway Community Information Center for Phase 2, along 125th Street between Park and Madison Avenues, was originally planned to open in May 2017. The center's opening was delayed to September 18, 2017.

Gallery

References

Further reading

External links 

 
 MTA's Arts For Transit — 125th Street (IRT Lexington Avenue Line)
 125th Street entrance from Google Maps Street View

1918 establishments in New York City
East Harlem
IRT Lexington Avenue Line stations
New York City Subway stations in Manhattan
Proposed IND Second Avenue Line stations
Railway stations in the United States opened in 1918